Bulli High School is a government-funded co-educational comprehensive secondary day school, located on Ursula Road in , in the northern Illawarra region of New South Wales, Australia. 

In 2018 the school catered for approximately 860 students from Year 7 to Year 12, of whom three percent identified as Indigenous Australians and ten percent were from a language background other than English. The school is operated by the NSW Department of Education.

Overview 
The school has a proud tradition in the community for excellence in academic, sporting and cultural pursuits. Bulli High School is the only high school in the Seacliff Community of Schools.

See also 

 List of government schools in New South Wales
 List of schools in Illawarra and the NSW South East
 Education in Australia

References

External links 
 

Educational institutions with year of establishment missing
Public high schools in New South Wales
Schools in Wollongong